Under California Stars  is a 1948 American Trucolor Western film directed by William Witney and starring Roy Rogers, Jane Frazee and Andy Devine. The film was shot in Trucolor. After returning from Hollywood after his tenth anniversary in films to his ranch, Rogers tackles a gang who kidnap his horse Trigger and hold it to ransom.

This film is now in the public domain.

Plot
Roy has just finished his latest film and leaves for his ranch where be will be broadcasting a show celebrating his tenth year in movies. When Roy and Trigger arrive at his ranch he finds Cookie has hired his relatives. Caroline, the only relative that doesn't have a strong resemblance to Cookie, is the horse trainer. Bob Tells Roy a gang of men are hunting range horses. Roy puts a stop to hunting 
on his land. Pop decides there's money in kidnapping Trigger and demands a $100,000 ransom. McFarland's stepson, Ted, and his dog Tramp, run away and is found hiding in Roy's barn. A trap is set to catch the kidnappers ranch.

Cast
 Roy Rogers as Roy Rogers
 Trigger as Trigger, Roy's Horse
 Jane Frazee as Caroline Bullfincher
 Andy Devine as Cookie Bullfincher / Alf Bullfincher
 George Lloyd as Pop Jordan
 Wade Crosby as Lige McFarland
 Michael Chapin as Ted Carver
 House Peters Jr. as Henchman Ed
 Steve Clark as Sheriff
 Joseph A. Garro as John the Banker
 Paul Power as Movie Director Paul
 John Wald  as WYX Radio Announcer
 Bob Nolan as Bob
 Sons of the Pioneers as musicians, ranch hands

Soundtrack
 Roy Rogers, Jane Frazee and the Sons of the Pioneers - "Under California Stars" (Written by Jack Elliott)
 Andy Devine and the Sons of the Pioneers - "Rogers, King of the Cowboys" (Written by Jack Elliott)
 Roy Rogers and the Sons of the Pioneers - "Dust" (Written by Johnny Marvin)
 Sons of the Pioneers - "Serenade to a Coyote" (Written by Andy Parker)
 Roy Rogers and the Sons of the Pioneers - "Little Saddle Pal" (Written by Jack Elliott)

See also
 Public domain film
 List of American films of 1948
 List of films in the public domain in the United States

External links

 
 

1948 films
1948 Western (genre) films
Republic Pictures films
Films set in Los Angeles
American Western (genre) films
Trucolor films
Films directed by William Witney
1940s English-language films
1940s American films